Maldà is a municipality in the comarca of Urgell, Catalonia, Spain.

Interesting places 
Castell de Maldà: Medieval castle built in the 13th and 14th centuries.
Església de Santa Maria: Baroque St. Mary church built in the 18th century.
Església de Sant Pere: Romanesque St. Peter church of the 12th century.
Església de Sant Joan de Maldanell: St. Joan of Maldanell church
Parc de la Font Vella: Leisure and picnic area.

Shops, associations and entities 
Maldà's agrarian cooperative (oil and wine)
"Ca l'Oncle" Rural House
"Cal Castell" Rural House
"Cal Xollador" Rural House
"Els Degotalls" Restaurant
Bar Centre

Photo gallery

See also 
 Sender de la Baronia de Maldà

References

External links 
 Maldà's Council website
 Government data pages 

Municipalities in Urgell
Populated places in Urgell